Drasteria sculpta is a moth of the family Erebidae. It is found in Kyrgyzstan and Kazakhstan.

References

Drasteria
Moths described in 1904
Moths of Asia